is a Japanese manga written by Sharin Yamano with a theme that draws on anti-Korean sentiment in Japan. The manga started as a webcomic on the author's website entitled CHOSEN, and after being refused publication for two years, it was published by Shin-yo-sha and released in Japan on July 26, 2005.  It was controversial and triggered a Japanese Internet movement.

This series of comic includes controversial topics surrounding Korea and Japan such as comfort women and the Liancourt Rocks, all of which are justified in favor of Japan throughout comics. After its publication, the comic hit number one in sales on Amazon.co.jp, which was reported in Korea, sparking much online controversy. The manga was controversial even outside Korea with The New York Times and The Times continuously reporting on the comic.

Plot
The main character of the story, Kaname Okiayu, a Japanese high school senior, learns about an alleged game-fixing scandal responsible for the winning streak of the South Korean soccer team during the 2002 FIFA World Cup and alleged ugly behavior by their supporters. Okiayu becomes a college freshman, and he and his female classmate Itsumi Aramaki join the Far East Asia Investigation Committee, an extracurricular group led by Ryūhei Sueyuki (a junior) and Tae Soeuchi (a sophomore). The group is mainly devoted to the study of historical disputes between Japan and Korea and is very critical of the latter. Okiayu and Aramaki are taught about many of the alleged ugly sides of Koreans. The group participates in debates with a pro-Korean study group and a group of students visiting from South Korea – both made ignorant of history and unable to make logical arguments – and rebuts their pro-Korean opinions, humiliating them.

The main topics of book include an alleged 2002 FIFA World Cup game scandal, Japanese compensation to Korea for colonial rule, opposition to Zainichi Koreans suffrage, alleged Korean plagiarism of Japanese culture, criticism of pro-Korean mass media in Japan, criticism of Hangul (Korean alphabet), Japan–Korea Annexation, Liancourt Rocks dispute, and criticism of the Korean Wave and its immense popularity in Japan.

Characters

Nicola Liscutin, author of "Surfing the Neo-Nationalist Wave: A Case Study of Manga Kenkanryū", noted that the art uses a "simple, abstract 'cartoony'" design with its Japanese protagonists in order to make the reader identify with them, while the opponents of the committee are depicted in an "exaggerated 'realistic' or even grotesque" manner that marks them as being different from the reader. According to Liscutin, characters of Korean descent are depicted with "pronounced cheekbones and thus, allegedly more realistic", including those friendly to the protagonists and those against the antagonists. Norimitsu Onishi of The New York Times states that the series depicts Korean characters with "Asian features", black hair, and narrow eyes while Japanese are portrayed with blond hair, large eyes, and "Caucasian features"; this manner of portraying Japanese people originates from a pro-Western self-identification movement dating to the Meiji Restoration, where Japanese envisioned themselves as being at the level of the Westerners. Liscutin adds that the series uses a photographic' realism" for real life figures such as Shintaro Ishihara.
 
 Liscutin describes him as an "ordinary high school student", originally believing that Japan had "done bad things to Korea", "not particularly interested in history" whose mind is changed after having a conversation with his grandfather. Liscutin states that originally Kaname is aware of discrimination against Koreans and is therefore a "softy".
   She convinces Kaname to join the "Far East Asia Investigation Committee".
 Liscutin describes her as "cute but tough".
   Kaname's best friend in high school, Kōichi is a Zainichi Korean who has what Liscutin describes as a "troubling identity crisis". Within the story he often tells Kaname and members of the committee that Koreans in Japan continue to experience discrimination.
 Liscutin states that Kōichi's character has a hot-tempered demeanor, a racial stereotype of young Zainichi males. There are times when he self-reflects and feels very insecure. Liscutin states that the students on the committee need Kōichi "in their narcissistic desire for esteem" while the story needs the Kōichi character "to enact its educational objectives;" she explains he is used "as the park and fuel for the lessons of the group."

Reception
The book was released in the midst of the recent "Korean Wave" pop culture boom in Japan, which was contributed to by imports of Korean TV dramas and other pop culture imports. This has led to increased positive awareness of Korea; it has also triggered a phenomenon known as the "Hate Korea Wave" (after which the book is named), due to increased awareness of various Japan–Korea disputes and the fanning of previously existing anti-Korean sentiment in Japan. The book's tagline says "There is one more Korean Wave that the media is hiding—the Hate Korea Wave!" The book is controversial both in and outside Japan because of opinions expressed in the book concerning major historical disputes and ongoing issues between Korea and Japan.

The book was created with the aim of spreading the "detestable reality" of South Korea, and encouraging identification of South Korea with these negative aspects, with the idea that by asserting this through the medium of manga, the ideas would "make as much of a hit as the Gōmanism Manifesto did" (as said by the author himself, according to the Kenkanryu Official Guidebook). Readers with existing anti-Korean sentiments have naturally accepted the author's viewpoint (which he asserts is the "correct understanding of South Korea"). 

Well-known revisionist writers have contributed four written articles to the book, however: Kanji Nishio (honorary chairman of the Japanese Society for History Textbook Reform) on the Korean people, Kohyu Nishimura (described as a "publicist") on the South Korean media, Takahiro Ōtsuki (a professor who was a member of the Society when it was formed) on the "Hate Korea Trolls" (Kenkanchū), and Masao Shimojō on the Liancourt Rocks dispute. The book also shows marked influence from the "liberal historical viewpoint" held by the Japanese Society for History Textbook Reform, and the book holds a historical viewpoint common to that of Yoshinori Kobayashi's Gōmanism Manifesto series (the fact that his name is given on the section about the ongoing debate over comfort women is also seen as a sign of his influence [Kenkanryu 1/Official Guidebook]).

Popularity in Japan

When the author first announced the publication of the cartoon in a comic form, a number of 2-channel users and bloggers made a suggestion that net users had to pre-order the book so that it can be a best seller. When the comic actually became a best-seller, internet was full of congratulatory comment celebrating the power of netizens. After its publication, netizens exchanged the comment over the difficulties in getting the book, information of the place where they can get a copied version, and recommendation that the others should read it too. Behind this movement was a contemporary Japanese netizens attitude towards media; they often reveal distrust claiming that media tries preventing the audience from knowing and understanding the truth. The rumor saying that the newspaper refused to advertise the comic, along with the rumor claiming that media and bookstores tried to manipulate their top-selling books in order to eliminate the comic from their rankings. 
Although this comic experienced huge media attention, this did not change the general attitude towards Korea among Japanese citizens. The comic might have generated curiosity among comic lovers and Net surfers, but Japanese house wives and K pop lovers continued to support Korean dramas and songs along with its culture. A survey released by the Japanese Cabinet in 2005 indicates that approximately 51.1% of Japanese citizens feel warmly towards Korea. Moreover, even among those who support this comic there are groups of people who question and challenge the validity of its contents.
The book had been refused publication for two years, and some Japanese newspapers refused to advertise the book.
When Amazon.co.jp started selling preorders of the book, it quickly rose to the #1 bestselling ranking.
According to the Shinyusha official website, the number of copies printed (as of 30 August 2005) is 300,000.
While the book reached the shelves of bookstores according to schedule on the release date, there was a general shortage of copies of the book immediately following the release date and it became difficult to find. It is thought that bookstores which did not carry it were few, however. The publisher quickly reprinted the book to meet demand.
The book was so successful (650,000 copies sold) that a sequel, Manga Kenkanryu 2 was released on 22 February 2006.
The total copies of Kenkanryu series are sold over one million on 19 March 2015.

Media responses from Japan
In the September 30th evening issue of the Yomiuri Shimbun, a review appeared criticizing the book as follows: "Is this not an example of the manipulation of the reader's impression through beautifying those who support you and portraying those who oppose you otherwise, which we have criticized China and Korea for doing?" This sentence also refers to outspoken right-wing social critic Yoshinori Kobayashi's practice of glorifying himself and demonizing opponents such as Hachirō Taku and Satoshi Uesugi, which is frequently criticized.
A positive comment about the book was written in the Chunichi Shimbun evening edition's Ōnami Sazanami (Billow and Ripple) column supporting the book's stance on the Liancourt Rocks dispute.
 On October 28th 2003 TBS Sunday Morning news program, Tokyo governor Shintaro Ishihara was shown at a rally in support of Japanese who had been abducted to North Korea, during which he remarked on camera, "It is not my intention to justify the history of Japan's annexation of Korea 100 percent", but a technician erroneously superimposed a subtitle that read, "It is my intention..." The book covers the subject of Ishihara suing TBS for libel. The book does not mention that four concerned persons sent documents to the prosecutor, or that the Tokyo District Public Prosecutor's Office dropped Ishihara's case on the grounds that there was "no malicious intent on the part of TBS".
The July 26, 2005 issue of Tokyo Sports reported that the major newspapers Asahi Shimbun, Yomiuri Shimbun and Sankei Shimbun had refused to advertise the book. Some sports newspapers, including Evening Fuji (also published by Sankei Shimbun), however, advertised the book.
In the Amazon.co.jp Japanese Books Top Sales Rankings printed in the Asahi Shimbun from July 11–17, there was the explanatory message that "*Comics are not included in the rankings", and the Amazon rankings in other newspapers also showed this message. This message had not been shown before when the books were deleted from the Asahi rankings for July 4–10. This was contradicted, however, when the August 1–7 rankings showed the controversial manga Neo Gomanism Manifesto Special: On Yasukuni.
On the August 15–21 rankings, the "*Message From Amazon.co.jp: The manga titles removed until now from the rankings, Manga—The Hate Korea Wave and Manga—An Introduction to China: A Study of Our Bothersome Neighbors, will be included in the rankings from now on." was shown, and the two books then occupied the #1 and 2 rankings respectively.

Response from New York Times
The November 19, 2005 New York Times article "Ugly Images of Asian Rivals Become Best Sellers in Japan" by Japan critic Norimitsu Onishi describes Kenkanryu and another manga, Introduction to China, as "portraying Chinese and Koreans as base peoples and advocating confrontation with them." The article also discusses how the book reveals some of the sentiments underlying Japan's current worsening relations with the rest of Asia, as well as the country's longstanding unease with its own sense of identity. It claims that the book is influenced by how much of Japan's history in the last century and a half has been guided by the goal of becoming more like the West and less like Asia and how the book perhaps inadvertently betrays Japan's conflicted identity of a longstanding feelings of similarities toward the West and superiority toward the rest of Asia.

Response from Times
The November 1, 2005 Times article "Neighbour fails to see funny side of comic" by Tokyo correspondent Leo Lewis describes Kenkanryu and another manga, Chugoku Nyumon (Introducing China) and Yasukuni Shrine as not only "dangerous" but also having "funny side".

Responses from Internet communities

After the release, arguments both against and for the book became the focus of many blogs and message boards.
Immediately following the announcement of the decision to release the book, it became an active topic in personal blogs, 2channel and other message boards, and movements calling for the preordering or purchase of the book developed.
The book has been widely promoted on websites, blogs and message boards such as 2channel and there are cases of inserting content directly from the book by websites criticizing South Korea (many reproducing photographs directly from the book) in the form of supplementing the book's contents, and also in the form of introducing information raised on the 2channel Hangul Board. As shown through the book's bibliography, a significant portion of the book's content (e.g. the World Cup and Korean plagiarism issues) was also sourced from websites.
Alongside cries to "Drive away the Hate Korea heat wave!", there were messages posted at the websites of Rakuten and other online stores calling for the burning of the book, while others called for the buying out of all available copies.

Responses from Korea

As a response to Manga Kenkanryu, South Korean cartoonist Yang Byeong-seol (양병설) published a cartoon book titled "Hyeomillyu" (혐일류; 嫌日流) – meaning "the anti-Japan wave" – in 2006. The book criticizes sexuality in Japan and statements by Japanese politicians regarding Japanese colonial rule in Korea. Another South Korean cartoonist, Kim Sung Mo (김성모), also published a cartoon book of the same title in 2006. The main topics of the book are Japanese militarism, Yasukuni Shrine, and Liancourt Rocks disputes. Although these cartoon books were published in both South Korea and Japan, they were not as influential as Manga Kenkanryu. About 5,000 copies of Yang's book have been sold in Japan; very few have sold in South Korea. Kim's book has sold about 20,000 copies in Japan, but only about 380 copies in Korea as of 2010.

Criticism

Due to the controversial content of the series, there have been many criticisms of the manga, the main complaint being that the series portrays Koreans in a negative light, while glossing over anything negative related to the Japanese. Critics cite examples of this both in the character portrayals of people representing their respective groups and in the commentaries actually made by various characters.

Regarding character portrayals, one complaint in The New York Times article is that "The Japanese characters in the book are drawn with big eyes, blond hair and Caucasian features; the Koreans are drawn with black hair, narrow eyes and very Asian features." Kenkanryu 2 objects to such a view; the author states that "this expression is a typical expression in cartoons in Japan." (Kenkanryu 2, P267) Another common critique is that the way in which the characters' personalities are presented is heavily one-sided and purposefully harmful to the image of Korea and its proponents in the manga: figures on the Japanese "side" have generally carefree, with enjoyable attitudes and coming from a variety of backgrounds; figures on the Korean side, on the other hand, consist only of arrogant members from educated, elitist backgrounds, leading to a heavily distorted, stereotyped presentation of Koreans.

Their main criticism, however, is based on the actual commentary and opinions espoused by some of the characters in the manga. One such example is the claim that South Korea owes its current success to Japan, which overlooks the negative aspects of the Japanese occupation in favor of the claim that Japan was the impetus for Korea's modernization.

The anti-Korean content of the book comes mainly from already-existing opinions espoused by critics of South Korea, though put in a manga format. Critics argue that by transferring opinions on these issues to this medium, it makes it easier for the author to convey his criticisms of Korea to people with no previous interest in Korea.

Contents on 2002 World Cup games
In Chapter 1, the book recounts the conduct of the Korean team in the 2002 World Cup games and claims that refereeing decisions in the Korean team's matches against Portugal and Spain were controversial. The book argues that the Korean team had an unfair advantage in certain key matches. On p. 20, a character states that "This subject was the talk of soccer-related internet message boards".

The book argues that the misjudgment was a decisive factor in the Korean team's record four advancements in the tournament (like Japan, the South Korean team had never won a World Cup game before 2002). As the book points out, four referee decisions were included in the 2004 FIFA Fever DVD release in its list of top 10 wrong referee decisions in the history of the World Cup. Although the book states that this DVD release was made by FIFA was in response to the demands of the "fair judgement movement", Exposing Manga Kenkanryu's Lies refers to a news article in which FIFA states that it was not they that directed the DVD's content, but another company under license from FIFA. FIFA, the official authority concerning game decisions in World Cup games, has never reversed any decisions from the 2002 games nor penalized any of the referees allegedly involved. The New York Times article by Norimitsu Onishi also states that the reason behind bringing up the 2002 FIFA World Cup was to justify Japan's lagging behind the South Korean team by questioning the validity of the South Korean team's success in an attempt to bring it down to an equal footing with Japan, as well as to combat the growing opinion in Japan that South Korea has emerged as a rival or even a superior to Japan.

The book also describes alleged misconduct by overzealous Korea supporters, on p. 20 saying, as an Asia Times article points out, that the sun disc on the Japanese flag displayed during the opening ceremony in Seoul was deliberately drawn bigger than the usual size to make the flag look like a used sanitary napkin.

Sequels and related books
In 2005, a supplementary volume was released entitled The Truth of "Manga – The Hate Korea Wave"! (Manga Kenkanryū no Shinjitsu, published by Takarajima-sha and released 2005-10-21), which attempted to bolster its claims that the arguments presented in The Hate Korea Wave are based in fact. A book attempting to debunk Kenkanryu has recently been released in Japan as well, entitled This Part of "Manga Kenkanryu" is Nonsense – A Serious Rebuttal.

Yamano Sharin published three sequels to Manga Kenkanryu, in 2006, 2007, and 2009. In 2008, the author also released a comic book titled Manga Kenchugokuryu (マンガ嫌中国流; translated as "The Hate China Wave") of which main topic is anti-Chinese opinions in Japan.

While continuing more or less with the basic setting of its predecessor, Manga Kenkanryu 2 also deals with such topics as Zainichi issues, the Sea of Japan naming dispute, and Japan's Protection of Human Rights Bill. It is also not merely a criticism of South Korea but also of the position of the Japanese media, House of Councillors member Tomiko Okazaki's participation in anti-Japanese demonstrations, and the educational position of the Japan Teachers Union. On the article regarding Zainichi issues, the book by name focuses upon South Korea but is centered upon the North Korean-linked Chogin Credit Cooperatives, Zainichi North Korean schools, and the North Korean abduction issue with focus upon Zainichi North Koreans and the North Korean-linked General Association of Korean Residents in Japan, and this aspect of the book's organization has undergone criticism from Japanese netizens for failing to touch upon the subject of Zainichi South Koreans and the South Korean-linked Korean Residents Union in Japan. Another issue the sequel deals with is the media's response (including that of The New York Times) to the original book.

See also

Ethnic persecution/discrimination
Ethnocentrism
Sharin Yamano
Japanese nationalism
Zaitokukai
Racism in Japan
Anti-Korean sentiment in Japan
Japan–Korea disputes

Bibliography

Tankōbon

Selection

Bunkobon

New series

Further reading

Japanese
Takarajima Supplementary Volume The Truth of "Manga – The Hate Korea Wave"! An Ultra-Primer to South Korean/Peninsular Taboos (Manga Kenkanryū no Shinjitsu! <Kankoku/Hantō Tabū Chōnyūmon>, published by Takarajima-sha, released 2005-10-21)
Takarajima Supplementary Volume The Truth of "Manga – The Hate Korea Wave"! Outside Scuffles (Manga Kenkanryū no Shinjitsu! Jōgai Rantō Hen, published by Takarajima-sha, released 2006-01-26) written by Takeshi Nakamiya, continuation volume to the former book
Shin'yūsha Mook – Kenkanryu Practical Handbook – Anti-Japanese Abusive Language Repulse Manual (Kenkanryū Jissen Handobukku: Han-Nichi Bōgen Gekitai Manyuaru – Shin'yūsha Mukku, published by Shinyusha, released 2005–12) written by Makoto Sakurai, a Japanese blogger also known under the name Doronpa
The Hate Korea Wave Debate – Refuting the Anti-Japanese Nation, South Korea (Kenkanryū Dibēto: Han-Nichi Kokka – Kankoku o Hanbaku suru, published by Sōgō Hōrei Shuppan, released 2005-12-22) written by Toshiaki Kitaoka and Debate University
Shinyusha Mook Series – Manga Kenkanryu Official Guidebook (Shin'yūsha Mukku Shirīzu – Manga Kenkanryū Kōshiki Gaidobukku, published by Shinyusha, released 2006-02-22)
Manga – An Introduction to China: A Study of Our Bothersome Neighbors (Manga Chūgoku Nyūmon: Yakkai na Rinjin no Kenkyū, published by Asuka Shinsha, released 2005-08-06) written by George Akiyama and supervised by Ko Bunyu: A manga written from a standpoint mainly criticizing the People's Republic of China. As its release date was close to that of The Hate Korea Wave, it was observed on 2channel as being "A Chinese edition of Kenkanryu". According to the publisher, 180,000 copies have been printed as of 2005-09-22. This book is also discussed in the aforementioned New York Times article.
This Part of "Manga Kenkanryu" is Nonsense — A Serious Rebuttal ("Manga Kenkanryū" no Koko ga Detarame — Majime na Hanron, published by Commons, released 2006-05), a collaboration by Osamu Ota, Pak Il, Gang Seong, Jeong Ha-mi, Jeong A-yeong, O Mun-suk, Tomo'o Kasetani, Takeshi Fujinaga, Ban Weol-seong and Go Gil-mi

Korean
Yang, B. (2006). 혐오-일류 [Anti-Japan wave]. Seoul, Korea: Nara. 
Kim, S. (2006). 혐오-일류 [Anti-Japan wave]. Seoul, Korea: Jayuguyeok.

References
 Liscutin, Nicola. "Surfing the Neo-Nationalist Wave: A Case Study of Manga Kenkanryū" (Chapter 10). In: Berry, Chris, Nicola Liscutin, and Jonathan D. Mackintosh (editors). Cultural Studies and Cultural Industries in Northeast Asia: What a Difference a Region Makes. Hong Kong University Press, May 1, 2009. . page 171.

Notes

Further reading

External links 

FAR EAST-- Author's official website

Anime and manga controversies
Anti-South Korean sentiment in Japan
Japan–Korea relations
2005 books